crank! A Record Company was an independent record label which was started by Jeff Matlow in September 1994. The label "played a huge role in the spreading of emo in the mid-’90s", according to Alternative Press magazine. The label's first release was a 7" by Vitreous Humor, released under the name Geerhead Records; all subsequent releases were issued as Crank!.

Artists

 Acrobat Down
 Boys Life
 Cursive
 Errortype:11
 Fireside
 The Get Set
 The Gloria Record
 The Icarus Line
 Jupither
 Last Days of April
 Mineral
 Neva Dinova
 Onelinedrawing
 The Regrets
 Sunday's Best
 The Vehicle Birth
 Vitreous Humor

See also 
 List of record labels

References

External links
 Official site for crank!

American independent record labels
Record labels established in 1994
Indie rock record labels
Alternative rock record labels